Koba Tsakadze (born 19 August 1934 in Bakuriani) is a Georgian ski jumper who competed from 1955 to 1972 for the Soviet Union. He won two events at Four Hills Tournament with one in 1955-56 (Innsbruck) and the other in 1960-61 (Garmisch-Partenkirchen).

Tsakadze also competed in two FIS Nordic World Ski Championships, earning his best finish of fifth in the individual normal hill event at Zakopane in 1962.

References

Living people
Male ski jumpers from Georgia (country)
Soviet male ski jumpers
1934 births
Olympic ski jumpers of the Soviet Union
Ski jumpers at the 1956 Winter Olympics
Ski jumpers at the 1960 Winter Olympics
Ski jumpers at the 1964 Winter Olympics
Ski jumpers at the 1972 Winter Olympics
People from Samtskhe–Javakheti